Neil Ritchie (1897–1983) was a British Army general. General Ritchie may also refer to:

Andrew Ritchie (British Army officer) (born 1953), British Army major general
Archibald Ritchie (British Army officer) (1869–1955), British Army major general
Richard Stephen Ritchie (born 1942), U.S. Air Force brigadier general